St John the Evangelist's Church, Greenock, is located in Union Street, Greenock, Inverclyde, Scotland. It is an active Anglican church in the Scottish Episcopal Church. It is designated by Historic Environment Scotland as a Category B listed building.

History

The original church on the site dated from 1824, and by the 1870s it had been decided to replace it with a larger church. A competition was held for its design, but this did not result in a satisfactory outcome. The perpetual curate of the church, Revd Julius Lloyd, recommended the Lancaster architects Paley and Austin, who were given the commission to design the church. It is the only church in Scotland designed by this practice. Building started in 1877 and the church was consecrated on 28 November 1878.  It cost a little over £7,000.  Sir Michael Shaw-Stewart gave £1,500 towards its cost, and land to allow enlargement of the original site.  In 1890 the successors in the Lancaster practice, Paley, Austin and Paley, designed stalls for the church, and in about 1897–98 the firm (then known as Austin and Paley) were asked to design an additional vestry.

Architecture

The architectural style is Gothic Revival. The plan of the church consists of a four-bay nave with a clerestory, a chancel with a chapel, and a tower at the southeast corner. Along the sides of the nave are three- and four-light windows.  The tower has a slate-covered pyramidal roof. Inside the church the arcades are carried on alternate octagonal and circular piers. The rood screen was designed by H. O. Tarbolton, and the font is a copy of a 15th-century font in Suffolk. The pipe organ was built by J. and A. Mirrlees of Glasgow.

See also
List of ecclesiastical works by Paley and Austin
 List of listed buildings in Greenock

References

Bibliography

Episcopal church buildings in Scotland
Category B listed buildings in Inverclyde
Churches completed in 1878
19th-century Anglican church buildings
Gothic Revival church buildings in Scotland
Paley and Austin buildings
Listed churches in Scotland
Churches in Inverclyde
Buildings and structures in Greenock